Kenneth Adie Ferguson (6 April 192115 April 2011) was an Australian veterinary scientist.

Family
Ferguson was born in Wahroonga, the fourth child of Eustace William Ferguson and Jessie Perry. He married Helen McVicar, veterinarian (born 1925 in Manly, NSW) in 1946 and they had five children, Deborah, Maggie Ferguson, Kate, John and Angus. They lived at West Pennant Hills in North-western Sydney, moving to Canberra in 1974 and eventually Newcastle in 2008, where he died in 2011.

Education
 Primary: Mowbray House School, Chatswood, NSW
 Secondary: Sydney Grammar School
 Tertiary: University of Sydney
 Post graduate: Christ's College 1948-1951, Cambridge. Doctor of Philosophy. Title of thesis: The influence of the anterior pituitary on wool growth.

Career

Commonwealth Scientific and Industrial Research Organisation

Purification and study of pituitary hormones with Alan Wallace.

Extended collaboration with Professor Leslie Lazarus and Dr Margaret Stuart of the Garvan Institute of Medical Research.

Novel method to protect food protein from breakdown in the rumen with Dr Trevor Scott

Polyunsaturated milk, cheese and meat products

Patents
Method and food composition for feeding ruminants 1967
Amino acid supplements 1976

Scientific administration
1968: officer-in-charge of the CSIRO Division of Animal physiology at Prospect, NSW
1973: chairman of the Animal Research Laboratories 
1978 until retirement in 1986: director of the CSIRO Institute of Animal and Food Sciences. Ferguson was also one of the founders of the Endocrine Society of Australia, and was its president from 1972 to 1974.

Endocrine society of Australia foundation member (1958) and  President 1962-74.

Retirement
Work with Dr Jim Watts, originator of soft rolling skin merino selection process.

Scientific archive
Unusually, his experimental scientific career is well documented. The extensive records and effects have been bequeathed to the National Library of Australia.

Honors
 Australian Centenary Medal, 2001
 Fellow, Australian Academy of Technological Sciences and Engineering 
 Fellow, Australian College of Veterinary Scientists

References

External links
 Obituary, Sydney Morning Herald 2012
 Origin of the Ferguson plot, 2007 Electrophoresis paper
 Ferguson plot analysis explanation, AES Electrophoresis society
Original paper describing the Ferguson plot technique, Metabolism, 1964

Veterinary scientists
Australian scientists
Recipients of the Centenary Medal
People educated at Sydney Grammar School
University of Sydney alumni
Alumni of Christ's College, Cambridge
2011 deaths
1921 births
Fellows of the Australian Academy of Technological Sciences and Engineering
Australian expatriates in the United Kingdom